Matt Beckett (born 13 July 1973) is a Welsh former-professional cyclist who was born in Lancaster. He represented Wales in the 1998 Commonwealth Games in Kuala Lumpur. He was briefly one of the directors of Welsh Cycling in 2006.

Palmarès

1998
2nd International Archer Grand Prix, Premier Calendar
2nd Lincoln Grand Prix, Premier Calendar
2nd Cliff Smith Memorial Road Race
1999
1st 27th Severn Bridge Road Race
1st Silver Spoon 2 day, Premier Calendar
1st Stage 1, Silver Spoon 2 day, Premier Calendar
2005
21st L'Étape de la Déponce, 2 day stage race
21st Points Race, L'Étape de la Déponce
21st Stage 1, L'Étape de la Déponce
22nd Stage 1, L'Étape de la Déponce
2006
34th Welsh National Road Race Championships
2007
21st 'Presidents Trophy' Handicap Race
21st Race 1, Pembrey Criterium Series
21st Race 2, Pembrey Criterium Series
31st Race 1, South Wales Criterium Series
31st Race 2, South Wales Criterium Series
42nd Race 3, South Wales Criterium Series
2nd Race 1, CC Abergavenny Handicas series
93rd Noel Jones Memorial Road Race

References

1973 births
Living people
Welsh male cyclists
Commonwealth Games competitors for Wales
Cyclists at the 1998 Commonwealth Games
Sportspeople from Cardiff